Myrtle Kahea Hilo (May 17, 1929 - October 3, 2009) was a native Hawaiian taxicab driver, radio personality, ukulele player and singer. Her signature album The Singing Cab Driver was released in 1967 on Makaha Records. She was born in Hauʻula, Hawaii on the island of O'ahu. In 1998 she received the Lifetime Achievement Award from the Hawai'i Academy of Recording Arts.

Background and early career
Myrtle Kahea Hilo was born of Hawaiian ancestry in Hauʻula on the island of O'ahu, in the Territory of Hawaii.  In 1948, she married heavy equipment operator George Hilo.  They became the parents of one son and four daughters. Hilo worked as a cashier, and a taxicab driver before achieving success in the entertainment business.

According to the online Territorial Airwaves, Hilo briefly sang with the Royal Hawaiian Girls Glee Club. She came under the mentorship of Hawaiian cultural preservationist George Naʻope in the early 1950s when he performed at the Niumalu Hotel (where the Hilton Hawaiian Village now stands). Together with Naʻope, she recorded with John Kameaaloha Almeida on their Tropical Records label, and on the 49th State Hawaii label.

Commercial success

In the late 1960s, she began to make a name for herself in Waikiki venues. She accompanied herself on ukulele and recorded her first album The Singing Cab Driver on the Makaha Label. Hilo was featured at Sunday entertainment galas in Waikiki promoted by Kimo Wilder McVay. She had her own daily live broadcast on KHVH radio, from the Outrigger Reef Hotel, and a Sunday evening live broadcast  from the Moana Hotel.

Between 1967 and 1973, Hilo recorded three albums. Her break-out hit  "Will You Love Me (When My Carburetor Is Busted)" eventually became a classic, and is believed to be an adaptation by George Naʻope of Benjamin (Bell) Zamberg  '"Carburetor the Automobile Song'" from Yiddish theatre.  By the 1970s she was filling in for Kahala Hilton headliner Danny Kaleikini.

Hilo continued driving her taxicab on a full-time basis, sometimes picking up fares after she closed her show at night.  Although she took regular fares, she also sometimes accommodated private tours. Travel companies began an arrangement with her for use of her name for United States mainland tours, while booking her as the on-board entertainment.

Later years
After three successive family deaths in 1976, her husband and both her parents, she took a sabbatical from performing and moved to Tacoma, Washington.

She returned to performing in Hawaii in 1987. In 1998, the Hawai'i Academy of Recording Arts presented her with the Lifetime Achievement Award at the Na Hoku Hanohano Awards.

Myrtle K. Hilo died in 2009.  Besides her husband, her daughter Healani also preceded her in death. She was survived by four of her children.

Discography
The Singing Cab Driver (1967) on Makaha Records (album)
Will You Love Me (When My Carburetor Is Busted) (1967) on Makaha Records (album)
Mahalo Plenty  (1973) Lehua Records

Singles
"Mauna Loa" (date unknown) with John Kameaaloha Almeida and Joe Keawe's Harmony Hawaiians on 49th State Hawaii
"Kila Kila O Haleakala" (date unknown) with John Kameaaloha Almeida and Joe Keawe's Harmony Hawaiians on 49th State Hawaii 
"Moana Loa" (date unknown) with Joe Keawe's Harmony Hawaiians on 49th State Hawaii

References

External links
Myrtle K. Hilo at Territorial Airwaves

1929 births
2009 deaths
20th-century American musicians
American radio personalities
Hawaiian music
Musicians from Honolulu
Na Hoku Hanohano Award winners
Native Hawaiian musicians
People of the Territory of Hawaii